James' Sum Tyneside Sangs 1898  is a chapbook on Tyneside music, published in 1898.

Details 

 Sum Tyneside Sangs  (or to give it its full title – "Sum Tyneside Sangs: A collection of Prize Songs, &c, in the Tyneside Dialect, by Matt. C. James ---- Reprinted from the "Newcastle Weekly Chronicle" and the "North of England Almanac" ----Price Threepence ---- Newcastle-upon-Tyne Printed by Andrew Reid & Company, Limited ---- 1898
”) is a book of Geordie folk song, all written by Matthew C. James, consisting of approximately 28 pages with 14 songs, published in 1898.

A later edition taking 48 pages was reprinted and was sold in Aid of the Jarrow "Guild of Help"

The publication 
The front cover of the book was as thus :-

SUM TYNESIDE SANGS: 
A COLLECTION OF
Prize Songs, &c, in the Tyneside Dialect, 
BY
MATT. C. JAMES. 
– - – - – - -<br/ >
Reprinted from the "Newcastle Weekly Chronicle" and the
"North of England Almanac"
– - – - – - -<br/ >
PRICE THREEPENCE
– - – - – - -<br/ >
Newcastle-upon-Tyne
PRINTED BY ANDREW REID & COMPANY, LIMITED. 
– - – - – - -<br/ >
1898

Contents

See also 
Geordie dialect words
Matthew C. James
Thomas Allan
Allan's Illustrated Edition of Tyneside Songs and Readings

References

External links
 Farne archives click on” Sum Tyneside sangs” and “go”
 Allan’s Illustrated Edition of Tyneside songs and readings – page 512

English folk songs
Songs related to Newcastle upon Tyne
Northumbrian folklore
Chapbooks